Psi Capricorni, Latinized from ψ Capricorni, is a single star in the southern zodiac constellation of Capricornus. It is a yellow-white hued star that is faintly visible to the naked eye with an apparent visual magnitude of +4.13. The distance to this star is approximately 47.9 light years based on parallax measurements, and it is drifting further away with a radial velocity of +20 km/s.

This object is an F-type main-sequence star with a stellar classification of F5 V/ It is 1.4 billion years old with 1.4 times the mass of the Sun. The measured rotational velocity of this star is approximately 41 km/s (the Sun has an equatorial rotation velocity of 2 km/s). Analysis of the line profile of the star's spectrum indicates that it is undergoing differential rotation, with the variation by latitude being similar to the Sun.

Chinese name

In R. H. Allen's version, this star represented the battle-axe Yue.

References

External links
 
 

F-type main-sequence stars
Circumstellar disks

Capricornus (constellation)
Capricorni, Psi
Durchmusterung objects
Capricorni, 16
0805
197692
102485
7936